The FIL World Luge Championships 2000 took place in St. Moritz, Switzerland. This marked the only time since the 1981 world championships that the event has taken place on a naturally refrigerated track.

Men's singles

Women's singles

Men's doubles

Mixed team

Medal table

References
Men's doubles World Champions
Men's singles World Champions
Mixed teams World Champions
Women's singles World Champions

FIL World Luge Championships
2000 in luge
2000 in Swiss sport
Luge in Switzerland